Carlos Miguel Gomes de Almeida (born 24 September 1988), known as Carlitos, is an Angolan professional footballer who plays for Portuguese club S.C. Olhanense as a right back or a right winger.

Club career
Born in Vale de Cambra, Aveiro District of Angolan descent, Carlitos joined U.D. Oliveirense's youth academy at the age of 13. He went on to represent the senior side in both the third and second divisions, his first match in the latter competition occurring on 21 September 2008 in a 1–2 home loss against S.C. Covilhã and his first goal coming exactly three months later, as the hosts defeated S.C. Freamunde by the same score.

In the 2009 off-season, Carlitos signed a four-year contract with Primeira Liga club F.C. Paços de Ferreira. His maiden league appearance took place on 16 August, in a 1–1 home draw with FC Porto. The previous week, he had also come from the bench in the 2–0 loss against the same opposition for the Supertaça Cândido de Oliveira.

In the summer of 2010, Carlitos was loaned to his former team Oliveirense. He subsequently took his game to the Angolan Girabola, where he represented C.R.D. Libolo, F.C. Bravos do Maquis and G.D. Interclube, being reconverted into a right back in the process.

References

External links

1988 births
Living people
Portuguese sportspeople of Angolan descent
Sportspeople from Aveiro District
Portuguese footballers
Angolan footballers
Association football defenders
Association football wingers
Primeira Liga players
Liga Portugal 2 players
Segunda Divisão players
U.D. Oliveirense players
F.C. Paços de Ferreira players
S.C. Olhanense players
F.C. Alverca players
Girabola players
C.R.D. Libolo players
F.C. Bravos do Maquis players
G.D. Interclube players
Angola international footballers